Adenophora triphylla, also known as Japanese lady bell, is one of the 62 species of Adenophora. It is a flowering plant in the family Campanulaceae that is distributed mainly over the Korean Peninsula, Japan, and China.

Ecology 

It has a white and thickened taproot, shaped like a carrot, 7-16 × 1.5-1.8 cm in diameter. Stems are white pilose with alternately arranged leaves. It has oval, almost round, serrated leaves growing to  that are white, sharply pointed, and pilose. A. triphylla flowers are about - long and have both male and female organs (hermaphrodite), each having 5 stamens and a pistil (the long head of the pistil overhangs the flower). Flowers are pollinated by insects. Seeds are yellow-brown colored and oblong slightly compressed, -.

 Habitat: Grassy areas in lowlands and mountains. 
 Suitable for: Grassy places in lowland and mountain with loamy soils. 
 Distribution: Korea, Japan, China, Laos, Russia (Far East, Eastern Siberia), Vietnam.

Cultivation details 
Adenophora triphylla grows well in a warm and sunny or slightly shaded niche, but cannot grow in full shade; A. triphylla needs alkaline soil that is slightly moisturized, or peaty soil. Slugs have been known to destroy its young growth or even mature plants.

Propagation 
Adenophora triphylla grows wild in mountains and meadows, but is also cultivated. The seed can be sown in spring and germinates in 1–3 months. It can be planted out into a permanent positions while young.

Chemical constituents 
Adenophora triphylla roots contain chemical compounds that are saponins and triterpenes.

Traditional medicine 
In Korea, A. triphylla is traditionally used for sputum, cough and bronchial catarrh. It is believed to have antifungal, expectorant, and cardiotonic effects.

References 

Campanuloideae
Plants described in 1784
Medicinal plants of Asia
Edible plants